Till The Cows Come Home is the second full-length album by the German metal band Farmer Boys.  The album has fewer songs referring to farm life or farm animals than  their debut album, Countrified, and had more of a nu metal sound.  A music video for "When Pigs Fly" was made which features the band playing the song and later hanging upside-down from meat hooks.

Track listing 
Prized – 3:50
When Pigs Fly – 4:05
Barnburner – 3:36
Boar – 2:56
Pig Nick – 3:51
Till the Cows Come Home – 4:18
Pain Is Party – 2:48
Sunburnt – 3:29
A Dream with a Dream – 3:37
Murder Me – 5:04
High to Die – 5:35

1997 albums
Farmer Boys (band) albums